Claressa Maria Shields (born March 17, 1995) is an American professional boxer and mixed martial artist. She has held multiple world championships in three weight classes, including the undisputed female light middleweight title since March 2021; the undisputed female middleweight title from 2019 to 2020; and the unified WBC and IBF female super middleweight titles from 2017 to 2018. Shields currently holds the record for becoming a two and three-weight world champion in the fewest professional fights. As of October 2022, she is ranked as the world's best active female middleweight by BoxRec, as well as the best active female boxer, pound for pound, by ESPN and The Ring.

Shields is the only boxer in history, female or male, to hold all four major world titles in boxing—WBA, WBC, IBF and WBO—simultaneously, in two weight classes.

In a decorated amateur career, Shields won gold medals in the women's middleweight division at the 2012 and 2016 Olympics, making her the first American boxer to win consecutive Olympic medals. Shields was the youngest boxer at the February 2012 U.S. Olympic Trials, winning the event in the  middleweight division. In May, she qualified for the 2012 games, the first year in which women's boxing was an Olympic event, and went on to become the first American woman to win an Olympic gold medal in boxing. Her only loss professional or amateur comes from British fighter Savannah Marshall. In 2018, the Boxing Writers Association of America named her the Female Fighter of the Year.

Early life
Shields was born and raised in Flint, Michigan, where she was a high school junior in May 2012. She was introduced to boxing by her father, Bo Shields, who had boxed in underground leagues. Bo was in prison from the time Shields was two years old, and released when she was nine. After his release, he talked to her about boxer Laila Ali, piquing her interest in the sport. Bo, however, believed that boxing was a men's sport and refused to allow Shields to pursue it until she was eleven. At that time she began boxing at Berston Field House in Flint, where she met her coach and trainer, Jason Crutchfield. Shields credits her grandmother with encouraging her to not accept restrictions based on her gender.

Amateur career

After winning two Junior Olympic championships, Shields competed in her first open-division tournament, the National Police Athletic League Championships 2011; she won the middleweight title and was named top overall fighter and also qualified for the U.S. Olympic Trials. At the 2012 Olympic Trials, she defeated the reigning national champion, Franchón Crews-Dezurn, the 2010 world champion, Andrecia Wasson, and Pittsburgh's Tika Hemingway to win the middleweight class. In April 2011, she won her weight class at the Women's Elite Continental Championships in Cornwall, Ontario against three-time defending world champion Mary Spencer of Canada; she held an undefeated record of 25 wins and 0 losses at that point.

Following Shields' victory at the U.S. Olympic Trials, it was initially reported that she would need only a top-8 finish at the 2012 AIBA Women's World Boxing Championships in Qinhuangdao, China, in order to qualify for the 2012 Olympics. On May 10, the day after the contest began but before Shields' first bout, a change to the rules was announced that meant Shields would need to place in the top two from the (North, Central, and South) American Boxing Confederation region of AIBA (AMBC).

Shields won her first round but was beaten in the second round on May 13 to Savannah Marshall of England, bringing Shields' record to 26–1.

Her chances for qualification thus depended on Marshall's subsequent performance; after Marshall advanced to the middleweight finals on May 18, it was announced that Shields had earned an Olympic berth. At the 2012 Summer Olympics in London, aged 17, she won the gold medal in the women's middleweight division after beating veteran Russian boxer Nadezda Torlopova 19–12.

In 2014, Shields won the World Championship gold medal, and the following year, she became the first American to win titles in women's boxing at the Olympics and Pan American Games. As a result of her performance in the Pan American Games, she was given the honour of serving as Team USA’s flag bearer at the closing ceremony.

Shields won the gold medal at the 2016 AMBC Olympic Qualifying tournament in Argentina defeating Dominican Republic's Yenebier Guillen in her final bout on her 21st birthday. Later that year at the 2016 Summer Olympics in Rio, she won the gold medal in the women's middleweight division by defeating Nouchka Fontijn of the Netherlands. She was awarded the inaugural women's division of the Val Barker Trophy at the competition. Her back-to-back Olympic gold medal wins made her the first American boxer to win consecutive Olympic titles.

Her amateur boxing record was 64 wins (5 by knockout) and 1 loss.

Professional boxing career
In November 2016, Shields officially went pro. She won her first match, against Franchón Crews-Dezurn, by unanimous decision.

On March 10, 2017, she faced Szilvia Szabados for the North American Boxing Federation middleweight title, and won by TKO.  This was the main event on ShoBox, with a regional title fight between Antonio Nieves and Nikolai Potapov serving as the co-main event.  It was the first time a women's boxing bout was the main event on a United States premium network card.

On June 16, 2017, Shields headlined the "Detroit Brawl," facing Sydney LeBlanc in her first scheduled eight-round bout. LeBlanc signed on with three days notice, after Mery Rancier dropped out due to visa issues. Shields won the bout by decision after all eight rounds.

On August 4, 2017, Shields defeated defending champ Nikki Adler in Detroit for the WBC super-middleweight belt and the vacant IBF super-middleweight belt. By 5th Rd TKO the ref had to jump in to protect The undefeated Nikki Adler. The fight was on Showtime.

On January 12, 2018, Shields retained her WBC and IBF female super middleweight titles, and won the WBAN super-middleweight title by defeating 17-0 Tori Nelson. It was Shields' first time going all 10 rounds in her professional career.

On June 22, 2018, in just her sixth professional fight, Shields defeated Hanna Gabriel by unanimous decision, winning the vacant WBA and inaugural IBF middleweight belts, breaking the record for becoming a two-weight world champion in the fewest professional fights, a record previously held by Vasyl Lomachenko. During Round 1, she experienced the first knock down of her professional career. She dropped down from 168 pounds to 160 for the fight. This was her first fight with trainer John David Jackson, having worked with Jason Crutchfield for the previous 5.

On December 8, 2018, Shields' fight aired on HBO, her first appearance on the network, a fight which was a part of the last boxing card to occur on HBO. She faced Femke Herman's outboxing her all 10 rounds for a unanimous decision.

On April 13, 2019, Shields became the undisputed women's middleweight world champion, unifying the WBA, WBC, IBF and WBO middleweight titles, along with The Ring magazine's inaugural middleweight belt, after defeating Christina Hammer by unanimous decision.  The victory was a near shutout with two judges scoring the bout 98–91 while a third judge scored it 98–92.

Shields was scheduled to fight Ivana Habazin for the vacant WBO junior middleweight title in Flint, Michigan, on October 5, 2019. However, the fight was postponed due to Habazin's trainer being attacked at the weigh in.

On January 10, 2020, the battle between Shields and Habazin took place with an all female ring (referee). The Atlantic boardwalk hall had a sold out Venue as  Claressa won by unanimous decision, 99–89, 100–90 and 100–89, and became the fastest ever to win titles in 3 divisions male or female in history.

On March 5, 2021, Shields defeated Marie-Eve Dicaire by unanimous decision to retain her WBC and WBO super welterweight titles, claim IBF 154-pound belt, and vacant WBA light middleweight strap. With the win she has become the first world champion boxer in four-belt era to hold undisputed titles in two different weight divisions. This Fight took place in Shields hometown with limited crowd due to COVID-19 pandemic.

Shields then faced Ema Kozin on February 5, 2022. She captured an unanimous decision with all referees scoring every round for her, and retained her WBA, WBC, IBF, and The Ring female middleweight titles meanwhile winning the WBF female middleweight title also.

Shields was initially scheduled to face reigning WBO Middleweight Champion Savannah Marshall in a title unification bout on September 10, 2022. However, due to the death of Queen Elizabeth II the bout was postponed to take place on October 15, 2022.

On the night of the fight, Shields went the full 10 round distance against Marshall. According to CompuBox stats, Shields outlanded Marshall 175 to 136; landed significantly more jabs, 44 to 14; and landed more power, 131 to 122. Shields won via unanimous decision with two judges scoring the fight 97–93 and one scoring it 96–94, all in favor of Shields to become the undisputed middleweight world champion. This fight occurred at the O2 Arena and was the first time two female boxers headlined at a major venue in the United Kingdom. As well, the fight headlined the first all-female boxing card in the United Kingdom.

Professional mixed martial arts career
In November 2020, Shields had signed a three-year contract with Professional Fighters League and was expected to make her mixed martial arts debut in 2021. Since Shields first announced that her MMA debut, she has also begun training in Brazilian Jiu-Jitsu and has gone to train under IBJJF no gi World Champion Roberto Alencar, alongside Holly Holm. She also started training at JacksonWink MMA in late 2020.

Shields made her MMA debut at PFL 4 on June 10, 2021, against Brittney Elkin. She won the fight via technical knockout in round three.

Her second bout was initially scheduled to take place on the PFL 9 event on August 27, 2021, against an opponent yet to be named. However, on July 12, 2021, news surfaced that her bout was rescheduled to take place on August 19, 2021, in order to garner more exposure at an ESPN-aired PFL 8 event. It was eventually rescheduled for PFL 10 on October 27, 2021, with Shields facing Abigail Montes. Shields lost the bout via split decision.

Personal life

Shields is from Flint, Michigan. Shields was baptized at age 13 (two years after she began boxing) and began attending a local church. She found strength in her Christian faith and eventually left home.

Shields attempted to adopt her cousin's daughter in 2014.

Shields is an ambassador for Up2Us Sports, a national non-profit organization dedicated to supporting underserved youth by providing them with coaches trained in positive youth development.

Shields is also an ambassador for gender equality in sports, particularly boxing, which she insists is under-covered by the media.

Shields is a pescatarian.

Filmography
Shields is the subject of the 2015 documentary T-Rex: Her Fight for Gold.  In 2016 Universal Pictures, a division of Comcast, which holds Olympic broadcast rights in the United States, acquired the rights to produce a film about her life story. Barry Jenkins is the screenwriter. Entitled Flint Strong, Rachel Morrison will be directing, with actress Ryan Destiny portraying Shields.

Shields will be acting in the Susan Seidelman-directed film Punch Me.

In 2018, Shields acted in a Walmart ad directed by Dee Rees.

Awards
In 2017, Shields won the Nickelodeon Kids' Choice Sports Award for "Biggest Powerhouse." In 2018, Shields was inducted into the USA Boxing Alumni Association's Hall of Fame. The Boxing Writers Association of America gave her the 2018 Christy Martin Award - Female Fighter of the Year.

Professional boxing record

Mixed martial arts record

|-
| Loss
|align=center|1–1
|Abigail Montes
|Decision (split)
|PFL 10 
|
|align=center|3
|align=center|5:00
|Hollywood, Florida, United States
|
|-
| Win
|align=center|1–0
|Brittney Elkin
|TKO (punches)
|PFL 4 
|
|align=center|3
|align=center|1:44
|Atlantic City, New Jersey, United States
|
|-

References

Further reading

External links

 
 
 Claressa Shields at PFL
 
 
 
 America's Boxing Women Aim for the Olympics at The New York Times
 

|-

|-

|-

|-

|-

|-

|-

|-

|-

|-

1995 births
Living people
American women boxers
African-American boxers
Boxers from Michigan
Sportspeople from Flint, Michigan
African-American mixed martial artists
African-American sportswomen
American female mixed martial artists
Mixed martial artists utilizing boxing
Boxers at the 2012 Summer Olympics
Boxers at the 2016 Summer Olympics
Medalists at the 2012 Summer Olympics
Medalists at the 2016 Summer Olympics
Olympic boxers of the United States
Olympic gold medalists for the United States in boxing
Boxers at the 2015 Pan American Games
Medalists at the 2015 Pan American Games
Pan American Games gold medalists for the United States
Pan American Games medalists in boxing
AIBA Women's World Boxing Championships medalists
World light-middleweight boxing champions
World middleweight boxing champions
World super-middleweight boxing champions
World Boxing Council champions
International Boxing Federation champions
World Boxing Association champions
World Boxing Organization champions
The Ring (magazine) champions
Olivet College alumni
21st-century African-American sportspeople
21st-century African-American women